Shesh Pir Rural District is a rural district (dehestan) in Hamaijan District, Sepidan County, Fars Province, Iran. At the 2006 census, its population was 8,197, in 1,799 families.  The rural district has 19 villages.

References 

Rural Districts of Fars Province
Sepidan County